Park Kyoung-doo ( or  ; born 3 August 1984) is a South Korean right-handed épée fencer, four-time team Asian champion, 2016 individual Asian champion, and two-time Olympian. 

Park competed in the 2012 London Olympic Games and the 2016 Rio de Janeiro Olympic Games.

Medal Record

World Championship

Asian Championship

Grand Prix

World Cup

References

1984 births
Living people
Sportspeople from South Jeolla Province
South Korean male épée fencers
South Korean épée fencers
Korea National Sport University alumni
Fencers at the 2012 Summer Olympics
Fencers at the 2016 Summer Olympics
Olympic fencers of South Korea
Fencers at the 2010 Asian Games
Fencers at the 2014 Asian Games
Fencers at the 2018 Asian Games
Asian Games gold medalists for South Korea
Asian Games silver medalists for South Korea
Asian Games bronze medalists for South Korea
Asian Games medalists in fencing
Medalists at the 2010 Asian Games
Medalists at the 2014 Asian Games
Medalists at the 2018 Asian Games